Henry Austin Martin (23 July 1824 – 7 December 1884) was an English-born American physician known for introducing the method of production and use of smallpox vaccine lymph from calves.

Early life and education

Birth 
Martin was born on 23 July 1824 in London, England. His father was Henry James Martin, Esq. M. R. C. S.

Martin married Francis Coffin Crosby (born 16 Nov 1825). They had the following children:

 Henry Maclean (15 May 1849); 19th in descent from Edward III through maternal lineage, verified member of the Sons of the American Revolution (maternal great-great-grandfather Josiah Crosby served under Colonel James Reed as a Captain in the 3rd New Hampshire Regiment) 
 Stephen Crosby, MD (17 September 1850) 
 Austin Agnew, AB, LLB (3 November 1851)
 Frances Moody (3 April 1855; 17 Mar 1857)
 Francis Coffin, AB, MD (22 Mar 1858)

Education 
Martin graduated from Harvard Medical School with an MD in 1845. He received an honorary A.M. from Dartmouth.

Death 
The family is buried in Lowell Cemetery in Lowell, Massachusetts.

Career 
Martin was a staff surgeon with the U. S. Vols and a Brevet Lieutenant Colonel "for gallant and meritorious services" in a wartime campaign.

He is also the namesake of Martin's Bandage, as well as Martin cartilage clamp, Martin incision, Martin vigorimeter, and Martin's Disease (periosteoarthritis of the foot from excessive walking).

Martin is best known for standardizing a method of vaccine production from calves which had been used for at least a century, the technique of which was utilized by Aventis-Pasteur. The vaccine was thought to have saved Boston from a potentially catastrophic 1873 epidemic, but he was widely criticized by medical peers and the general public. Human lymph later became illegal in the United States since it no longer provided adequate immunity, and apparently played a role in the 1905 supreme court case JACOBSON v. MASSACHUSETTS regarding compulsory vaccination.

Vaccinia virus, a member of the poxvirus family, affected rodents and is believed to have become extinct in the late 1800s. It is a critical component of the modern smallpox vaccine. Survival of the vaccinia is credited to Martin, sons Francis and Stephen, and Martin's lineage of pupils who preserved the virus in a laboratory setting.

Later in his career, Martin was an advocate for bovine vaccines which were thought to preserve potency and mitigate risk of syphilis transmission. He worked against anti-vaccination activists, and exposed fraudulent manufacturers whose vaccines were both unsafe and ineffective.

Awards and honors 

 American Medical Association Vaccine Committee chair
 Martin's vaccine contribution will be commemorated by a historical marker at 27 Dudley Street, in the Roxbury section of Boston, where Martin lived and produced smallpox vaccine in a barn behind his house.

Publications 

 Scientific American, "The Cultivation of Vaccine Virus", 20 November 1880, p. 325
 Letters of Henry A. Martin
 AMA vs. Henry Martin
 A Few Words on "unfortunate Results of Vaccination"
 Hahnemann and Paracelsus. On Some Ancient Medical Delusions, and Their Connection with Errors Still Existing: An Address Delivered Before the Norfolk District Medical Society, November 11, 1857

References 

1824 births
1884 deaths
19th-century English medical doctors
Harvard Medical School alumni